The Admiralspalast (German for admiral palace) is a 1,756-seat theatre on Friedrichstraße in the Mitte district of Berlin, Germany. Opened in 1910, it is one of the few preserved variety venues of the pre-World War II era in the city.

As a place of amusement the Admiralspalast originally included a skating rink, a public bath, bowling alleys, a café and a cinema open day and night. After World War I it changed to a revue theatre, starting with the show Drunter und drüber by Walter Kollo, later continued by the performance of operettas. 

As the building suffered little damage from World War II bombing, it was home to the Berlin State Opera until the reconstruction of the Berlin State Opera house in 1955. On April 21–22 1946, the Social Democratic Party of Germany and the Communist Party of Germany in the Soviet occupation zone held a convention at the Admiralspalast where they merged to become the Socialist Unity Party of Germany. The performance of revues and operettas were continued under the name of  until its disestablishment in 1997. 

The GDR Union of Journalists had its offices inside the Admiralspalast. 

On August 11, 2006, it reopened with The Threepenny Opera, directed by Klaus Maria Brandauer.

References

External links

Theatres in Berlin
Theatres completed in 1910
1910 establishments in Germany